The amethystine python (Simalia amethistina, formerly known as Morelia amethistina), also known as the scrub python or sanca permata in Indonesian, is a species of non-venomous snake in the family Pythonidae. The species is found in Indonesia and Papua New Guinea. Popular among reptile enthusiasts, and noted for its coloration and size, it is one of the largest snakes in the world, as measured either by length or weight, and is the largest native snake in Papua New Guinea. Until 2000, the larger S. kinghorni was generally considered a subspecies of S. amethistina, and this change of classification has still not been universally reflected in literature. Because of this issue, S. amethistina has often been described as the largest snake in Australia, but this is not accurate since under the current classification, this species does not occur in Australia.

Taxonomy
Formerly, five subspecies of Morelia amethistina, including the nominate race, M. a. amethystina, were generally recognized. The Moluccan Islands (including Halmahera, Ternate and Tidore) are home to the former M. a. tracyae.  The Tanimbar Islands are home to a smaller subspecies, the former M. a. nauta. On the island of Seram, the former M. a.  clastolepis can be found. On mainland of Papua New Guinea (including the Indonesian western half, once called Irian Jaya—now West Papua), and many of its nearby offshore islands, the former M. a. amethystina is quite common. In Australia, the former M. a. kinghorni is represented. American biologist Michael Harvey and colleagues investigated the amethystine python complex and recognised five separate species Simalia amethistina, Simalia clastolepis, Simalia kinghorni, Simalia nauta, and Simalia tracyae based on cladistic analysis of cytochrome b sequences and morphology. In 2014 cladistic analysis of nuclear and mitochondrial genes of pythons and boas, R. Graham Reynolds and colleagues supported the distinctness of M. tracyae, M. amethistina, and M. clastolepis, but were less confident of M. kinghorni and M. nauta.

According to McDiarmid et al. (1999), all cases in which the specific name was spelled with a y follow Daudin's (1803) Python amethystinus and are therefore unjustified emendations. The specific name, amethistina, is an allusion to the milky iridescent sheen on its scales, which gives it an amethyst-like colour.

Description

The smooth dorsal scales are arranged in 39–53 rows at midbody. There are deep, heat-sensing pits on six or seven of the posterior lower labials.

Distribution and habitat
The Amethystine python is found in Indonesia (Maluku Islands, Timur Laut Islands, Banda, Kai Islands, Aru Islands, Misool, Salawati, most of Western New Guinea, many islands in Geelvink Bay, such as Biak, Numfor, Yapen, and Supiori), and Papua New Guinea (including Umboi Island, Bismarck Archipelago, Trobriand Islands, the d'Entrecasteaux Islands to Rossel Island, Louisiade Archipelago). The type locality is unknown.

S. amethistina occurs in both bushland and suburbia. In Indonesia, it is found mostly in rainforests. Warm, humid habitats with good water sources are preferred. In northern Australia and New Guinea, it mostly lives in scrublands.

Feeding
The diet of the amethystine python generally consists of birds, bats, rats, possums, and other small mammals. Larger Papuan specimens catch and eat wallabies, and cuscus, waiting by creek and river banks for prey seeking drinking water.

References

Further reading
Schneider JG (1801). Historiae Amphibiorum naturalis et literariae Fasciculus Secundus continens Crocodilos, Scincos, Chamaesauras, Boas, Pseudoboas, Elapes, Angues, Amphisbaenas et Caecilias. Jena: F. Frommann. vi + 364 pp. + Plates I–II. ("[Boa] Amethistina", new species, p. 254). (in Latin).

External links

Morelia (snake)
Reptiles described in 1801
Reptiles of Queensland
Reptiles of Indonesia
Reptiles of Papua New Guinea
Snakes of New Guinea
Snakes of Australia
Reptiles as pets
Taxobox binomials not recognized by IUCN